Nigel Sparshott (2 September 1961 - 30 September 1998) was a speedway rider from England.

Speedway career 
Sparshott began his career at Crayford in 1978 before joining Milton Keynes Knights in 1979. The following year he signed for King's Lynn Stars who rode in the top tier of British Speedway during the 1980 British League season. When the 1981 season started he was riding for Milton Keynes when he was recalled for parent side King's Lynn. Following a full season with Milton Keynes in 1982 he came to the attention of the Oxford Cheetahs who signed him for the 1983 season.

It was the 1984 season that saw the Oxford Cheetahs famously break the British transfer records as they started the season in the 1984 British League season, they bought Hans Nielsen for a record £30,000, Simon Wigg for £25,000, Marvyn Cox for £15,000 and Melvyn Taylor for £12,000. Sparshott retained his place in the team his place at number 7. The following year in 1985, he was rarely used during the 1985 season as he spent most of the season at Exeter Falcons on loan but he earned his place in history as Oxford won the league and cup double.

He continued to ride in British speedway until his retirement after the 1993 season.

Death
In 1998, he died after his van crashed into a barn.

References 

1961 births
1998 deaths
British speedway riders
Birmingham Brummies riders
Crayford Kestrels riders
Eastbourne Eagles riders
Exeter Falcons riders
King's Lynn Stars riders
Long Eaton Invaders riders
Middlesbrough Bears riders
Milton Keynes Knights riders
Oxford Cheetahs riders
Rye House Rockets riders 
Wimbledon Dons riders